Almaguer is a surname. Notable people with the surname include:

Frank Almaguer (born 1945), United States diplomat
Ilean Almaguer (born 1990), Mexican actress best known for her roles in telenovelas and dozens of TV commercials
Sergio Almaguer (born 1969), Mexican coach and former defender and Striker
Miguel Almaguer (born 1977/78), NBC News correspondent for Los Angeles bureau

See also
Almaguer, Cauca, town and municipality in the Cauca Department, Colombia
Corral de Almaguer, Spanish municipality of Toledo province, in the autonomous community of Castile-La Mancha